The 1933 National Challenge Cup was the annual open cup held by the United States Football Association now known as the Lamar Hunt U.S. Open Cup. As in 1931, the ASL teams played a round robin format instead of direct knockout games. The five New York teams formed the Metropolitan group. The New England group included the three remaining ASL teams along with Victoria Mills of the Southern New England Association who qualified by defeating Fairlawn Rovers. The Round Robin was somewhat unpopular because of the methods used. Despite a league setup, games tied at the end of regulation were to go into overtime. In the event of a tie in the standings, goal average was used to break the tie. A slight controversy ensued when a game between Boston and Fall River was called at the 78th minute with the score 0-0. Fall River later forfeited the replay leaving Boston tied for first with Pawtucket. The Rangers advanced on better goal average leaving Boston unable to make up the difference in a replay with Fall River or a playoff with Pawtucket. In the West it was business as usual with the standard knockout procedure and the Stix of St. Louis making their second of what would be six consecutive trips to the national final. Other highlights include Bert Patenaude's five goal performance against Fairhill in the First German Club's first round match on January 14.

Eastern Division

Western Division

a) aggregate after 3 games
b) replayed after protest

Round Robin Groups

Final

First game

Second game

Sources
St. Louis Post-Dispatch

U.S. Open Cup
Nat